A good faith estimate, referred to as a GFE, was a standard form that (prior to 2015) had to be provided by a mortgage lender or broker in the United States to a consumer, as required by the Real Estate Settlement Procedures Act (RESPA). 
Since August 2015, GFE has been replaced by a loan estimate form, serving the same purpose but following slightly different guidelines set by CFPB, so as to reduce consumer confusion. A good faith estimate (or a loan estimate) is a standard form intended to be used to compare different offers (or quotes) from different lenders or brokers.
The estimate must include an itemized list of fees and costs associated with the loan and must be provided within 3 business days of applying for a loan.  Since RESPA does not apply to Business Purpose Loans, no GFE is provided in those transactions.

These mortgage fees, also called settlement costs or closing costs, cover every expense associated with a home loan, including inspections, title insurance, taxes and other charges.

The good faith estimate is only an estimate. The final closing costs may be different; however the difference can only be 10% of the third party fees. Once a good faith estimate is issued the lender/broker cannot change the fees in the origination box.

Fees and charges

The fees included within a good faith estimate fall into six basic categories:

Loan fees
Fees to be paid in advance
Reserves
Title charges
Government charges
Additional charges

The following is a list of the typical charges. Each charge starts with a number – the same number as the number of the charge on a HUD-1 Real Estate Settlement Statement. This makes it easier to compare the charges a loan applicant receives on the good faith estimate to the HUD-1.

800 ITEMS PAYABLE IN CONNECTION WITH LOAN:

801 - Loan Origination Fee
This fee is a charge for originating or creating the loan

802 - Loan Discount
This is an upfront charge paid to the lender to get a lower mortgage rate – the same as “buying the rate down”

803 - Appraisal Fee
This is the cost of the independent appraisal. It is usually paid by the buyer.

804 - Credit Report
This is the cost of the credit report

805 - Lender's Inspection Fee
This is the lender's cost of inspecting a property – some may double check the appraisal provided by an independent appraiser

808 - Mortgage Broker Fee
This is the upfront charge that a mortgage broker charges. Brokers can also earn a “rebate” from the lender which is not listed here

809 - Tax Related Service Fee
Lender fee, usually small, for handling tax related matters

810 - Processing Fee
This is the charge for processing the loan – collecting the buyer's application, running credit, collecting pay stubs, bank statements, ordering appraisal, title, etc.

811 - Underwriting Fee
This is the cost of the loan underwriter (approver)

812 - Wire Transfer Fee
This is the cost of wiring the money around, which is usually done by escrow.

900 ITEMS REQUIRED BY LENDER TO BE PAID IN ADVANCE

901 - Interest for days X $ per day
This is the prepaid interest for a mortgage loan.

902 - Mortgage Insurance Premium
This is the prepaid mortgage insurance premium, if needed. This is the insurance premium some lenders charge for loans with little equity.

903 - Hazard Insurance Premium
This is used to record hazard insurance premiums that must be paid at settlement in order to have immediate insurance on the property. It is not used for insurance reserves that will go into escrow.

905 - VA Funding Fee
This is the Veterans Administration funding fee, which is only applicable if the loan is through a VA program.

1000 RESERVES DEPOSITED WITH LENDER

1001 - Hazard Insurance Premiums # months @ $ per month
This is any prepayment of future hazard insurance expense

1002 - Mortgage Ins. Premium Reserves months @ $ per month
This is any prepayment of future mortgage insurance expense

1003 - School Tax months @ $ per month
This is any prepayment of future school tax expense

1004 - Taxes and Assessment Reserves months @ $ per month
This is any prepayment of future tax expenses, such as property taxes

1005 - Flood Insurance Reserves months @ $ per month months
This is any prepayment of future flood insurance expense

1008 - Aggregate Accounting Adjustment
This is a credit to the buyer.  By law, the lender is not allowed to collect more than the sum of initial payments for reserve items.  The aggregate adjustment is the amount the lender must 'credit' the borrower at closing, so that they don't collect more than the law allows.

1100 TITLE CHARGES

1101 - Closing or Escrow Fee
This is the cost of escrow. This is the service of a neutral party that actually handles the money between all the different parties in a real estate transaction, including: the lender, the buyer, the seller, the agents, notary, etc. This is often done by the “Title Company” – a related entity in the same office that provides title insurance

1105 - Document Preparation Fee
This is the charge for preparing the loan documents. Lenders often email the loan documents to the escrow company, which in turn prints them out and reviews them before signing. However, some title companies are owned by an attorney who will also draw certain legal documents for the buyer's closing.

1106 - Notary Fees
This is the cost of the notary. This is to have all of the legal documents surrounding this transaction notarized. When closing inside the title company office, there is usually no charge for this.

1107 - Attorney Fees
Any legal charges associated with clearing the title to the property.

1108 - Title Insurance
This is the cost of insuring the title of the property. If there is a question about title (who really owned the property), or if a judgment or lien was really paid off, after the transaction is done then this insurance protects the lender and owner from future problems.

1200 GOVERNMENT RECORDING & TRANSFER CHARGES

1201 - Recording Fees
This is the cost of updating relevant government records

1202 - City/County Tax/Stamps
Unavoidable government charge

1203 - State Tax/Stamps
Unavoidable government charge

1204 - Electronic Recording Fee
Many counties now allow documents to be recorded electronically. This expedites the issuance of a title policy by several weeks.

1300 ADDITIONAL SETTLEMENT CHARGES

Anything 'extra' that is not included in the 800-1200 charges are itemized in the 1300 section. This includes things like the survey, HOA fees, and repairs.

1302 - Pest Inspection
This is the cost of the pest inspector. Their purpose is to document the state of the property that the lender is making the loan on.

See also
Title insurance in the United States
United States Department of Housing and Urban Development
Truth in Lending Act
Predatory lending
Annual percentage rate
Real estate contract

References

External links
FDIC Laws, Regulations, and Related Acts

Mortgage industry of the United States